Michael J. Barber (born September 16, 1960) is an American engineer who is an executive at General Electric. His research considers X-ray electronics.  He was elected Fellow of the American Institute for Medical and Biological Engineering in 2014.

Early life and education 
Barber was born in Milwaukee and attended John Marshall High School. As a senior, he completed an internship at General Electric, where he was based in medical imaging. He studied electrical engineering at the Milwaukee School of Engineering. During this time, he started to complete more internships at GE, eventually working for them full time and completing his undergraduate degree in night classes.

Research and career 
In 1981, Barber was appointed to the electrical engineering team at General Electric. He started his career working on software for X-ray imaging systems. After eight years, he moved to computer tomography, where he developed firmware and hardware, and eventually to magnetic resonance imaging. Barber established Healthymagination, the GE strategy on global health, where he was responsible for reducing the costs associated with accessing care by more than 15%.

Barber was made Chief Technology Officer of General Electric Healthcare in 2007, chief operating officer in 2013, and President of computer tomography. Barber developed the United States' first touch-screen interface for X-ray imaging systems. He retired from his engineering role in 2020, and was made Chief Diversity Officer.

At General Electric, Barber developed the Human Resources program, including their African American forum. He serves on the Board of the National Action Council for Minorities in Engineering. He joined the board of Catalent in 2021.

Awards and honors 
 2009 Black Enterprise Master of Innovation
 2012 Honorary doctorate from the Milwaukee School of Engineering
 2014 Elected Fellow of the American Institute for Medical and Biological Engineering
 2018 Rotary Person of the Year
 2022 NAACP Game Changer Award Winners in Education
 2023 Elected member of National Academy of Engineering

Personal life 
Barber is married to Jackie Herd-Barber, an electrical engineer he met during his undergraduate degree. Together they have two children.

References 

1960 births
Living people
20th-century American engineers
21st-century American engineers
Scientists from Milwaukee
Engineers from Wisconsin
Milwaukee School of Engineering alumni
General Electric people
Fellows of the American Institute for Medical and Biological Engineering
African-American engineers